Solanum crinitum, also frequently called Solanum macranthum (common name giant star potato tree) is a medium-sized (to forty feet (twelve meters) tropical tree from Brazil belonging to the Potato family (Solanaceae) and is noteworthy for two things. First its flowers  continue to grow bigger even after they open, eventually becoming two inches (5 centimeters) wide.  It also has the shortest lifespan of any full-sized tree. It is full-grown at age four, and is usually dead by its fifth year. If pollinated, the flowers produce a round, orange fruit about two inches (five centimeters) in diameter. The 5-to 7-lobed leaves are about 15 inches (39 cm) in length and about half as wide.

References

crinitum